Renato Pereira da Silva Alberto (born 27 October 1985 in São Paulo), known as Renato Kanu, is a Brazilian former football striker.

References

External links

 at Fora de Jogo

1985 births
Living people
Brazilian footballers
Brazilian expatriate footballers
Association football forwards
Club Atlético Zacatepec players
Liga I players
FC Brașov (1936) players
Expatriate footballers in Mexico
Expatriate footballers in Portugal
Expatriate footballers in Romania
Footballers from São Paulo